Dancing Stars is a 1952 West German musical comedy film directed by Géza von Cziffra and starring Germaine Damar, Georg Thomalla and Fita Benkhoff. It was shot at the Wandsbek Studios of Real Film in Hamburg. The film's sets were designed by the art directors Albrecht Becker and Herbert Kirchhoff.

Cast
Germaine Damar as Nicolle Ferrar
Fita Benkhoff as Nicolle Ferrar, her mother
Georg Thomalla as Bob Gregorian
Axel von Ambesser as Sir Thomas Gregorian
Ursula Justin as Daisy
Alice Treff as Daisy's mother
Ursula Herking as Jeannette
Vera Marks as Sylvia
Inge Meysel as Sylvia's mother
Oskar Sima as Alfons
Joseph Offenbach as Gerichtsvollzieher
Carl-Heinz Schroth as Gregor Gregorian
Ilja Glusgal as singer
Evelyn Künneke as singer
Rita Paul as singer
Leila Negra as singer
Kenneth Spencer as singer
Gerhard Wendland as singer
Lonny Kellner as singer
Das Montez-Ballett as dancers
Das Cornell-Trio as singers
Hiller-Girls as dancers
Helmut Ketels as dancer
Liselotte Köster as dancer
Edward Lane as dancer
Jockel Stahl as dancer
Günther Fuhlisch as Trombone player (Philhamonisches Filmorchester)
Macky Kasper as Trumpet player (Philhamonisches Filmorchester)
Rolf Kühn as Clarinet player (Philhamonisches Filmorchester)

References

External links

1952 musical comedy films
German musical comedy films
West German films
Films directed by Géza von Cziffra
German black-and-white films
1950s German films
1950s German-language films
Films shot at Wandsbek Studios